Strange Journey is a 1946 American drama film directed by James Tinling and starring Paul Kelly, Osa Massen and Hillary Brooke. On an isolate island, a reformer gangster and his wife battle a group of Nazi agents attempting to get their hands of uranium deposits.

Cast
 Paul Kelly as Lucky Leeds 
 Osa Massen as Christine Jenner 
 Hillary Brooke as Patti Leeds 
 Lee Patrick as Mrs. Lathrop
 Bruce Lester as Roger Blythe 
 Gene Roth as Hansen 
 Kurt Katch as Horst 
 Fritz Leiber as Prof. Jenner 
 Larry J. Blake as Karl 
 Joseph Crehan as Thompson 
 Louise Franklin as Nellie 
 Daniel De Jonghe as German 
 Peter Michael as German 
 Kurt Neumann as German

References

Bibliography
 Phillips, Alastair & Vincendeau, Ginette. Journeys of Desire: European Actors in Hollywood. British Film Institute, 2006.

External links
 

1946 films
1946 drama films
American drama films
Films directed by James Tinling
20th Century Fox films
American black-and-white films
1940s English-language films
1940s American films